Nakade is a Japanese surname. People with this surname include:
Sanya Nakade (1897–1971), Japanese painter
Hikari Nakade (born 1988), Japanese football player
 (born 1991), Hong Kong political activist involved in the 2016 Hong Kong Legislative Council candidates' disqualification controversy

Japanese-language surnames